Urna URNA may refer to:
 Urna, a Buddhist symbol
 Urna (singer) (born 1969), Mongolian singer
 Urna (Antarctica), a mountain in Queen Maud Land
 Útvar rychlého nasazení, a special weapons and tactics unit of the Czech Police
 U-RNA, a type of RNA

See also 
 Urn (disambiguation)
 Erna (disambiguation)